Roussin Academy High School was located in Pointe-aux-Trembles (12085-1212, rue Notre-Dame Est), a district in the eastern part of Montreal. The school served the English-speaking Catholic population of Pointe-aux-Trembles, Montreal-Est, Anjou and some off-island cities including Charlemagne. Roussin was amalgamated into Laurier Macdonald High School in the 1983–84 school year. It was also originally Napoleon Courtemanche High School in a different location.

Roussin Academy was part of a school board called Commission Scolaire Jérôme-Le-Royer and was opened due to a great demand for English speaking students that could not go to Laurier Macdonald High School because of overpopulation.

The school commission took over the Roussin Academy building in 1971 and ran the school there until 1983. The last graduating class of Roussin Academy was the class of 1983.

References 

Defunct schools in Canada
Educational institutions disestablished in 1982
Educational institutions established in 1914
High schools in Montreal
1914 establishments in Quebec